Buckhannon-Upshur High School (B-UHS) is a high school located in Buckhannon, West Virginia, United States with approximately 1,300 students. It is located at 270 B-U Drive, about two miles south of Buckhannon city limits. The school offers grades 9-12, and serves all of Upshur County with some students from surrounding counties. Randy West serves as principal of Buckhannon-Upshur High School.

The school's stated mission is to "improve our community by providing the opportunity for every student to grow socially and academically every day."

History
Buckhannon High School began in a wood frame building on East Main Street in Buckhannon in 1881. The school remained there until 1909 with the construction of a new facility on College Avenue. A gymnasium was added in 1922. In 1925, Upshur High School opened its doors on Route 20 about one mile south of Buckhannon High. Buckhannon High, a 7-12 school, was designated for the city kids; Upshur High, a 9-12 school, was designated for the county, or country kids.

Prior to the Great Depression, each West Virginia county had several district school boards. To save on expenses each county was consolidated into its own school district. As part of this action, the Upshur County School Board consolidated the two schools in 1933, creating Buckhannon-Upshur High School. The city and county students continued to meet in separate buildings until 1958, but all extracurricular activities, such as band and athletics met together as Buckhannon-Upshur High School.

In the early 1920s, Victoria High School, the school for Upshur County's black population located on Victoria Street less than one block from Buckhannon High, burned down due to a faulty heating system. No students were present at the time of the incident. A new 1-12 grade facility was built on Baxter Street near West Virginia Wesleyan College.

After World War II, Upshur County's black population dwindled considerably. Many black families left, seeking jobs in northern industrial areas as part of the Great Migration. With just three or four black high school students in the county, it was decided that they should be bused to Kelley-Miller School in Clarksburg so that racial segregation could be maintained. In 1954, Upshur County's school system was integrated. The few Upshur County black students were integrated into the city branch of Buckhannon-Upshur High School without incident.

In 1958, extensive renovations took place at the Upshur, or county, branch of B-UHS and all high school students began meeting in one facility in grades 10-12. The Buckhannon, or city, building became Buckhannon-Upshur Junior High School that same year, housing all Upshur County students in grades 7-9.

In 1977, a new campus for Buckhannon-Upshur High School was built two miles south of the old B-UHS on Route 20 and began housing grades 9-12 that year. Renovations were made to the school that had housed B-UHS since 1958, and Buckhannon-Upshur Middle School was created, housing students grades 6-8.

The Buckhannon-High that was built in 1909 was condemned in 1977, largely due to its inability to meet modern fire safety standards. It was used for storage until it was torn down in the early 1990s.  The original 1881 wooden facility was moved several yards south and used to house a portion of the elementary students attending East Main Street Elementary until it was demolished in the 1970s.

As of the 2009-2010 school year, B-UHS received a PRO-officer through a grant with the Upshur County Sheriff's Department. This officer assists at the school and goes into the classrooms to talk with students about issues associated with underage drinking, drug use, and other illegal activities. The officer is armed with a pistol and a collapsible police baton. In 2017, the pro officer was given a k-9 named Buck.

Demographics 
As of 2020, the Buckhannon-Upshur High School student body is 97% White, 1% Black, 1% Hispanic, and 1% Other. 52% of the student body is male while 48% is female. The school has a student/teacher ratio of 14.31 and per pupil expenditures of $11,720. The graduation rate is 86%. The setting of the school is fringe rural.

It is estimated that over half of all students are eligible for free or discounted lunch, and the county provides free lunch to all students regardless of eligibility.

Mascot and colors
The school's mascot is the Buccaneer.  Local newspapers began referring to the B-UHS football and basketball teams as Buccaneers in 1934.  The nickname soon ran into controversy in 1941.  Some local citizens felt it was inappropriate for high school students to be associated with pirates.  The nickname was changed to the Blue Eagles in 1941 and remained so until 1946.  In 1947 the Buccaneer mascot was brought back by popular demand and has remained ever since.

When the first football team was organized at Buckhannon High School in 1909, the school colors were blue and gray.  Upshur High School got its first football team in 1926 and chose red and white as its colors.  When the two schools merged in 1933, they also merged the colors.  Blue and white became the official colors of Buckhannon-Upshur High School and have remained to this day.

Athletics

BUHS offers sports including football, cross-country (boys' and girls') basketball (boys' and girls'), soccer (boys' and girls'), swimming (boys' and girls'), wrestling, golf, baseball, softball, cheerleading, and lacrosse (boys' and girls').  Football started in 1909, and boys' basketball in 1912.  Girls' basketball started in 1919, but was discontinued after the 1929 season and the onset of the Depression.  Girls' sports reemerged in the early 1970s.

 The Buckhannon-Upshur Buccaneer football team has won five West Virginia state championships, in  1915, 1918, 1924, 1963 AAA, and 1966 AAA.
 The boys' basketball team won state titles in 1921 and 1922.
 The baseball team won state titles in 1937 and 1972.
 The golf team won state championships in 1980, 1981 and 1982.
 The boys' soccer team won state titles in 1993, 1994 and 1995.
 The boys' cross-country team won its state championship in 1993.
 The girls' track team won the AAA state championship in 2010, 2011 and 2013.
 The boys' basketball team was runner-up to the state champions in 1916, 1918 and 1919.
 The baseball team was runner-up in 1941 and 1957.
 The football team was AAA runner-up in 1969.
 The girls' track team was AAA runner-up in 1989, 1990, 1992, 2007, and 2012
 The girls' cross-country team was AAA runner-up in 1987 and 1991.
 The girls' soccer team was runner-up in 1995.
 The boys' swim team was runners-up in 2000.
 The girls' lacrosse team was CLUB runner-up in 2010 and 2011.
 The girls basketball team was AAA runner-up in 2017.
 In the Fall 2010, Buckhannon-Upshur left the North Central Athletic Conference (NCAC) and returned to the Big Ten Conference in school athletics. The NCAC folded in 2011. Buckhannon High was a charter member of the Big 10 in 1930 and remained at B-UHS until 1986.  As the Big Ten Conference expanded to 14 teams, disputes over equal access to titles between big and small school led to six bigger schools, including B-UHS, exiting the conference and creating the North Central Athletic Conference (NCAC)in 1986.  In 2010, B-UHS and four other schools reentered the Big 10.
Buckhannon-Upshur added girls and boys club lacrosse teams in 2008.

Music programs

The Buckhannon-Upshur Blue & White Marching, Symphonic, Concert, and Jazz Bands have earned many awards, including being WVMEA Honor Band finalists many times over the years. They continue to earn "Superior" ratings at the regional Band Festival.  They are directed by Eliza Taylor, the first female director in the history of the B-UHS Bands and only the ninth director since its inception in 1923.

The Buckhannon-Upshur Choirs have earned many awards, including being the WVMEA High School Honor Choir at the WVMEA conferences over the years, and have earned numerous "Superior" ratings at festivals. It was considered one of the best high school choirs in West Virginia during Director James W. Knorr, III's (1966–1999) 34 years of service. The choir program is growing and is again receiving superior ratings. There are currently 100 singers involved in the three choirs at the B-UHS. Jeremiah Smallridge is the current director.

Each Christmas season, the Buckhannon-Upshur Alumni Choir performs classic holiday literature for the Buckhannon community on the Saturday before Christmas.

They have recently added a Chamber Music Club and Pep Band to their music programs.  The Chamber Music Club is a group of smaller ensembles that meet on Wednesdays during CARE to practice music and get help for Instrumental music.  The BU Pep Band is a small group that plays at certain home basketball games.

Rival schools
Elkins is a rival of Buckhannon because of location and past interactions with each other.  The first football game between the two schools took place in 1920.

Lewis County is another rival of Buckhannon because of location. The first football game between Buckhannon High and Lewis (then called Weston High) took place in 1912.

References

External links 
Upshur County Schools
City of Buckhannon
The Record Delta newspaper
Buckhannon-Upshur High school alumni
Buckhannon-Upshur High school website

Public high schools in West Virginia
Educational institutions established in 1977
Buildings and structures in Upshur County, West Virginia
Education in Upshur County, West Virginia
1977 establishments in West Virginia